Type II sensory fiber (group Aβ) is a type of sensory fiber, the second of the two main groups of touch receptors. The responses of different type Aβ fibers to these stimuli can be subdivided based on their adaptation properties, traditionally into rapidly adapting (RA) or slowly adapting (SA) neurons. Type II sensory fibers  are slowly-adapting (SA), meaning that even when there is no change in touch, they keep respond to stimuli and fire action potentials. In the body,  Type II sensory fibers belong to pseudounipolar neurons. The most notable example are neurons with Merkel cell-neurite complexes on their dendrites (sense static touch) and  Ruffini endings (sense stretch on the skin and over-extension inside joints). Under pathological conditions they may become hyper-excitable leading to stimuli that would usually elicit sensations of tactile touch causing pain. These changes are in part induced by PGE2 which is produced by COX1, and type II fibers with free nerve endings are likely to be the subdivision of fibers that carry out this function.

Type II sensory fiber (group Aα) is another type of sensory fiber, which participate in the sensation of body position (proprioception). In each muscle, we have 10-100 tiny muscle-like pockets called muscle spindles. The type II fibers (aka secondary fibers) connect to nuclear chain fibers and static nuclear bag fibers in muscle spindles, but not to dynamic nuclear bag fibers. The typical innervation to muscle spindles consists of one type Ia fiber and 2 type II fibers. The type Ia fiber has "anulospiral" endings around the middle parts of the intrafusal fibers compared to type II fibers that have "flower spray" endings which may be spray shaped or annular, spreading in narrow bands on both sides of the chain or bag fiber. It is thought that the Ia fibers signal the degree of change in muscle movement, and the type II fibers signal the length of the muscle (which is later used for forming the perception of the body in space).

References 

Sensory systems